Eden Baja Sonsona (born December 27, 1988) is a Filipino professional boxer. He previously held the WBC and WBF International super featherweight titles, and the GAB Philippine bantamweight title.

He is a cousin of fellow boxer Marvin Sonsona.

Professional career
On his seventeenth professional bout on November 14, 2009, Sonsona made his U.S. debut on the undercard of Manny Pacquiao vs. Miguel Cotto, where he defeated Israeli Eilon Kedem via second-round technical knockout (TKO) at the MGM Grand in Las Vegas. In the following month, his first-round knockout of Monico Laurente won him the vacant Philippine bantamweight title. He then defeated Colombian former world champion Mauricio Pastrana by eighth-round TKO on the undercard of Pacquiao vs. Joshua Clottey in March 2010. However, in his subsequent match in July, he was knocked out by Jonathan Oquendo of Puerto Rico in their battle for the vacant WBO-NABO super bantamweight title.

Sonsona won seven of his nine subsequent fights before he won the vacant WBC International super featherweight title through his second-round TKO of then-unbeaten Adrián Estrella of Mexico on May 17, 2015. This was followed by a majority decision win over Jaime Barcelona in December 2016, before securing the vacant WBF International super featherweight title by first-round TKO win over compatriot Jovany Rota on February 26, 2017. He then challenged the undefeated Russian WBO Inter-Continental super featherweight champion Evgeny Chuprakov for a 	May 5 bout. Sonsona lost the match by a fifth-round TKO, ending the 12-fight unbeaten streak he maintained over the last 7 years.

In 2018, Sonsona lost his second rematch with Barcelona via unanimous decision. On March 17, 2021, he lost to Rimar Metuda.

Controversies
On June 19, 2021, Sonsona  was arrested for selling methamphetamine during a buy-bust operation in General Santos. The police say he was under surveillance for several months before his arrest.

References

External links
 

1988 births
Living people
Bantamweight boxers
Filipino male boxers
Sportspeople from General Santos
Boxers from South Cotabato